Diadegma is a genus of wasps described by Förster in 1869. Diadegma is part of the family Ichneumonidae.

Species of Diadegma 

 Diadegma acronyctae
 Diadegma aculeatum
 Diadegma acutum
 Diadegma adelungi
 Diadegma aegyptiacum
 Diadegma aestivale
 Diadegma agens
 Diadegma agile
 Diadegma akoense
 Diadegma albertae
 Diadegma albicalcar
 Diadegma albicinctum
 Diadegma albipes
 Diadegma albotibiale
 Diadegma alpicola
 Diadegma amphipoeae
 Diadegma angitiaeforma
 Diadegma angulator
 Diadegma annulicrus
 Diadegma antennaellae
 Diadegma anurum
 Diadegma areolare
 Diadegma areolator
 Diadegma argentellae
 Diadegma argyloplocevora
 Diadegma armillatum (Diadegma pseudocombinatum)
 Diadegma auranticolor
 Diadegma auricellae
 Diadegma aztecum
 Diadegma balticum
 Diadegma basale
 Diadegma blackburni (Diadegma hawaiiense)
 Diadegma boreale
 Diadegma brevipetiolatum
 Diadegma brevivalve (Diadegma valachicum)
 Diadegma buckelli
 Diadegma californicum
 Diadegma callisto
 Diadegma capense
 Diadegma carolina
 Diadegma chrysostictos (Diadegma bakeri, Diadegma corsicator, Diadegma costatum, Diadegma curtum, Diadegma galleriae, Diadegma incipiens, Diadegma kiehtani, Diadegma orientator, Diadegma petiolatum, Diadegma quinquerufum, Diadegma triangulare, Diadegma woonandi)
 Diadegma chrysostictum
 Diadegma cinnabaritor
 Diadegma claripenne
 Diadegma clavicorne
 Diadegma coleophorarum
 Diadegma colutellae
 Diadegma combinatum (Diadegma alpinator, Diadegma angustum, Diadegma femoratum)
 Diadegma compressum (Diadegma ruficoxale, Diadegma oedemisiformis, Diadegma paenerivale, Diadegma ferrugineipes)
 Diadegma comptoniellae (Diadegma digitatum)
 Diadegma consumtor (Diadegma alpestrator, Diadegma varians)
 Diadegma contractum
 Diadegma crassicorne (Diadegma normannicum, Diadegma brevicorne, Diadegma carnifex)
 Diadegma crassiseta
 Diadegma crassulum
 Diadegma crassum
 Diadegma crataegi
 Diadegma curvicaudis
 Diadegma cylindricum
 Diadegma defectivum
 Diadegma densepilosellum
 Diadegma dinianator
 Diadegma discoocellellae
 Diadegma dispar
 Diadegma dominans
 Diadegma duplicatum
 Diadegma elegans
 Diadegma elishae
 Diadegma elongatum
 Diadegma epinotiae
 Diadegma erraticum
 Diadegma erucator
 Diadegma erythropoda
 Diadegma erythropus
 Diadegma exareolator
 Diadegma fabricianae
 Diadegma falciferum
 Diadegma fenestrale
 Diadegma filicorne
 Diadegma filiformator
 Diadegma flavoclypeatum
 Diadegma flavotibiale
 Diadegma flexum
 Diadegma fugitivum
 Diadegma fulvipalpe
 Diadegma fumatum
 Diadegma fungicola
 Diadegma gallicator
 Diadegma gibbulum
 Diadegma glabriculum
 Diadegma gracile
 Diadegma gracillimum
 Diadegma grisescens
 Diadegma groenlandicum
 Diadegma hiraii
 Diadegma hispanicum
 Diadegma hokkaidense
 Diadegma holopygum
 Diadegma hospitum
 Diadegma hygrobium
 Diadegma imbecillum
 Diadegma incompletum
 Diadegma insectator
 Diadegma insulare
 Diadegma integrator
 Diadegma ishiyamanum
 Diadegma johanseni
 Diadegma koizumii
 Diadegma kozlovi
 Diadegma kyffhusanae
 Diadegma kyushuense
 Diadegma lactibiator
 Diadegma laricinellum
 Diadegma laterale
 Diadegma laticeps
 Diadegma latungula
 Diadegma ledicola
 Diadegma leontiniae
 Diadegma lithocolletis
 Diadegma litorale
 Diadegma longicauda
 Diadegma longicaudatum
 Diadegma lugubre
 Diadegma lyonetiae
 Diadegma maculatum
 Diadegma majale
 Diadegma major
 Diadegma mandschukuonum (Diadegma nordorientale)
 Diadegma maurum
 Diadegma mediterraneum
 Diadegma melanium
 Diadegma meliloti
 Diadegma meridionator
 Diadegma micrurum
 Diadegma minutum
 Diadegma mollipla
 Diadegma monospilum
 Diadegma moraguesi
 Diadegma muelleri
 Diadegma nanus
 Diadegma narcyiae
 Diadegma neocerophagum
 Diadegma neomajale
 Diadegma nepalense
 Diadegma nervosae
 Diadegma nigridens
 Diadegma nigrifemur
 Diadegma nigriscapus
 Diadegma nigrostigmaticum
 Diadegma nigrum
 Diadegma novaezealandiae
 Diadegma obliteratellum
 Diadegma obscurum
 Diadegma occultum
 Diadegma openangorum
 Diadegma operculellae
 Diadegma oranginator
 Diadegma paenesessile
 Diadegma paludis
 Diadegma parviforme
 Diadegma parvum
 Diadegma patruele
 Diadegma pattoni
 Diadegma pendulum
 Diadegma pilosum
 Diadegma pini
 Diadegma polonicum
 Diadegma psilocorsis
 Diadegma pulchripes
 Diadegma pulicalvariae
 Diadegma pulicator
 Diadegma pusio
 Diadegma pyreneator
 Diadegma rapi
 Diadegma rectificator
 Diadegma retusa
 Diadegma rufatum
 Diadegma ruficeps
 Diadegma rufigaster
 Diadegma salicis
 Diadegma sanguinicoxa
 Diadegma satanicolor
 Diadegma scotiae
 Diadegma semiclausum
 Diadegma simile
 Diadegma simplificator
 Diadegma solum
 Diadegma sordipes
 Diadegma speculare
 Diadegma spurcum
 Diadegma stagnale
 Diadegma stenosomum
 Diadegma stigmatellae
 Diadegma suecicum
 Diadegma tamariscator
 Diadegma tenuipes
 Diadegma trachas
 Diadegma transversale
 Diadegma trichopterorum
 Diadegma trichoptilus
 Diadegma tripunctatum
 Diadegma trochanteratum
 Diadegma truncatum
 Diadegma undulator
 Diadegma ungavae
 Diadegma valesiator
 Diadegma variegatum
 Diadegma velox
 Diadegma villosulum
 Diadegma zaydamense

Gallery

See also 
Parasitoid wasp

References

External links 

 
Ichneumonidae genera
Taxa named by Arnold Förster